Saiyadraja is a constituency of the Uttar Pradesh Legislative Assembly covering the city of Saiyadraja in the Chandauli district of Uttar Pradesh, India.

Saiyadraja is one of five assembly constituencies in the Chandauli Lok Sabha constituency. Since 2008, this assembly constituency is numbered 382 amongst 403 constituencies.

Election results

2022

2017
Bharatiya Janta Party candidate Sushil Singh won in 2017 Uttar Pradesh Legislative Elections defeating Bahujan Samaj Party candidate Shyam Narayan Singh by a margin of 14,494 votes.

References

External links
 

Assembly constituencies of Uttar Pradesh
Chandauli district